Mariano Matamoros y Guridi (August 14, 1770 – February 3, 1814) was a Mexican Roman Catholic priest and revolutionary rebel soldier of the Mexican War of Independence, who fought for independence against Spain in the early 19th century.

Biography 

Matamoros was born in Mexico City in 1770. He received a Bachelor of Arts in 1786 and a degree in theology in 1789. He was ordained as a Roman Catholic priest in 1796 and served in several churches around the city. During this time, he started to sympathize with rebellious issues and for this reason, he was jailed by the Spanish colonial authorities shortly after the war started. He managed to escape from prison and eventually joined the revolutionary army of José María Morelos on December 16, 1811.

One day before the Izucar battle, Morelos named him colonel and ordered him to create his own forces. With the population of Jantetelco, Matamoros created 2 regiments of cavalry, 2 battalions of infantry and 1 of artillery; in total his forces were composed by 2000 men.

During the Siege of Cuautla, from February 9 to May 2 of 1812, Morelos recognized Matamoros' ability in the battlefield and promoted him to the rank of lieutenant general, effectively making him second in command of the army. One night, Matamoros broke the siege and was able join Miguel Bravo in Aculco. Once the siege was lifted, the campaign continued in Oaxaca; it was surrounded on November 25 of 1812. Thereafter, Matamoros won more battles, first in Santo Domingo Tonalá against Manuel Lambrini followed by San Juan Coscomatepec and San Agustín del Palmar against the Asturias battalion.

Michoacán
Matamoros was in the Battle of Valladolid close to the city of Valladolid in Michoacán, the present day city of Morelia, where the Spanish army won. After the battle, on 5 January 1814, the army moved to Puruaran. Agustin de Iturbide attacked the Morelos army and it was a disaster; in the middle of the confusion, Matamoros tried to escape crossing the river (close to Puruaran) but was captured by Eusebio Rodríguez, a soldier from the battalion of "Frontera", who received 200 pesos and a promotion.

Allegedly, Morelos offered 200 Spanish prisoners in exchange for Matamoros, but was turned down by the Spanish colonial authorities.

Matamoros was removed from the priesthood and tried for treason. He was executed by firing squad in Valladolid, Michoacán on February 3, 1814.

Legacy 
In 1823, Matamoros was honored as "Benemérito de la Patria".  His remains now rest in the Independence Column of Mexico City.

Matamoros is a national hero of Mexico. In his honour, the Cuernavaca International Airport in Cuernavaca, Morelos, is named after him, as well as the cities of Izúcar de Matamoros, Puebla; Matamoros, Coahuila de Zaragoza; and Matamoros, Tamaulipas.

See also
History of Mexico
Viceroyalty of New Spain

References

External links 
 Mexico Desconocido.com.mx : Mariano Matamoros Biography (In Spanish)

Mexican revolutionaries
People of the Mexican War of Independence
1770 births
1814 deaths
Executed Roman Catholic priests
Executed Mexican people
People executed by New Spain
People executed by Spain by firing squad
People from Mexico City
People from Morelos
Mexican people of Spanish descent
1814 in New Spain
History of Michoacán